Hana Mae Lee (born September 28, 1988) is an American actress, model, comedian, and fashion designer. She is best known for playing the role of Lilly Onakuramara in the musical comedy Pitch Perfect film series (2012–2017) and the role of Sonya in the horror comedy film The Babysitter (2017) and its 2020 sequel. Lee also owns the fashion line Hanamahn.

Early life
Lee was born and raised in the San Fernando Valley, California. She attended Granada Hills Charter High School.

Lee enrolled in college at 16. She received her BFA in fashion design from Otis College of Art and Design in Los Angeles, California. She has designed for Juicy Couture, and Mossimo. She turned down working for Ralph Lauren in New York to further pursue acting.

Career
Lee's mother ran a beauty and hair salon for 25 years. At 15, Lee began doing makeup professionally, doing makeovers at Macy's before transitioning to editorial photo shoots. As of 2018, she has opted to forgo makeup work in pursuit of her entertainment career.

At 16, Lee became a professional model. She has appeared in campaigns for Honda, Jeep, Apple Inc., Nokia, Sebastian, American Express, HP, Cherry Coke and Midori. She has appeared in the magazines TIME, SOMA, Elle, and Teen Vogue.

Lee started doing stand-up comedy in 2009. She is also a part of the comedy duo, Get Gaysian. Lee would often incorporate Korean folk music into her comedy performances.

Lee started her jewelry line, Hanamahn, in 2001. She launched the apparel line for Hanamahn in 2009; several of the pieces have appeared in the Pitch Perfect films. As of 2018, the brand is on hiatus, with a sister line in development.

In 2011, Lee made her TV debut guest starring on Mike & Molly, followed by an appearance on Workaholics.

She appeared as Lilly Onakuramara in the musical comedy film Pitch Perfect, for which she was nominated for the Teen Choice Award for Choice Movie Scene Stealer in 2013. Lee reprised her role in the sequels Pitch Perfect 2 (2015) and Pitch Perfect 3 (2017).

Lee co-starred in McG's horror film The Babysitter (2017), and reprised her role in the sequel The Babysitter: Killer Queen (2020).

Personal life 
Lee is a Korean American.

Filmography

Film

Television

References

External links

21st-century American actresses
American film actresses
American make-up artists
American actresses of Korean descent
American models of Korean descent
American television actresses
American women comedians
Living people
1988 births
Comedians from California
21st-century American comedians
Actresses from Los Angeles County, California
Otis College of Art and Design alumni
Granada Hills Charter High School alumni